The Lorraine Open is a defunct men's tennis tournament that was played as part of the Grand Prix tennis circuit from 1979 to 1989. It was held in Lorraine, one of the 26 regions of France. The venue alternated annually from Lorraine's two main cities of Metz and Nancy, with Nancy hosting odd-numbered years, and Metz even-numbered. The surface in both locations was indoor carpet courts.

Results

Singles

Doubles

See also
 Moselle Open – men's tournament held in Metz

References

 
Grand Prix tennis circuit
Carpet court tennis tournaments
Indoor tennis tournaments
Defunct tennis tournaments in France
Sport in Nancy, France
Sport in Metz